Jake Matthew Lloyd (born March 5, 1989), also known as Jake Broadbent, is an American retired actor who portrayed young Anakin Skywalker in the 1999 film Star Wars: Episode I – The Phantom Menace and Jamie Langston in Jingle All the Way.

Early life
Jake Matthew Lloyd was born in Fort Collins, Colorado on March 5, 1989. 

Lloyd attended Carmel High School in Carmel, Indiana, where he graduated in 2007.

Career
Lloyd began his acting career in 1996, playing Jimmy Sweet in four episodes of ER. He was then cast as Jake Warren in Unhook the Stars. He got his big break playing Jamie Langston in Jingle All the Way. He also played Mark Armstrong in Apollo 11. Lloyd gained worldwide fame when he was chosen by George Lucas to play the young Anakin Skywalker in the 1999 film Star Wars: Episode I – The Phantom Menace, the first film in the Star Wars prequel trilogy. Lloyd received the Young Artist Award for Best Supporting Actor.

In 2000, Lloyd starred in the dramas Die with Me and Madison, then retired from acting, although Madison was not released in cinemas until 2005.

Post-Star Wars work
After retiring from acting in 2001, Lloyd continued to make appearances at sci-fi and comic-book festivals. In 2012, he announced that he would be directing a documentary highlighting Tibetan refugees in India. Lloyd was commissioned in 2012 to create a promotional video for singer Mallory Low. Star Wars: Episode II – Attack of the Clones actor Daniel Logan, who played the young Boba Fett in the film, starred in the video. Lloyd left Hollywood for Chicago, and dropped out after a semester at Columbia College Chicago, where he studied film and psychology.

Personal life
In 2012, Lloyd explained that his decision to retire from acting in 2001 was due to bullying at school and harassment by the press, both in response to his role in The Phantom Menace.

Legal troubles
In March 2015, police responded to an alleged assault by Lloyd on his mother Lisa Riley. In a statement to the Indianapolis Metro Police Department, Riley alleged Lloyd arrived at her house and began verbally berating her. He then progressed to physically assaulting her, but she declined to press charges, revealing that Lloyd had been diagnosed with schizophrenia and was not taking his medication at the time. 

On June 17, 2015, Lloyd was arrested in South Carolina under the name Jake Broadbent for reckless driving, driving without a license, and resisting arrest; he failed to stop for a red light, which initiated a high-speed police chase. At a hearing on June 22, his bail was set at $10,700. On June 23, Lloyd's mother stated to TMZ that he has schizophrenia and that "the family plans to try and get him help again [...] once he's released from jail". Lloyd was not released on bail.

In April 2016, after being held for 10 months awaiting trial in Colleton County Detention Center, Lloyd was transferred from jail to a psychiatric facility due to his schizophrenia diagnosis. 

In January 2020, his family issued a statement saying that he has moved closer to his family, and has officially been diagnosed with paranoid schizophrenia.

Filmography

Film

Television

Video games

References

External links

1989 births
Living people
21st-century American male actors
Actors from Fort Collins, Colorado
American male child actors
American male film actors
American male television actors
American male video game actors
American male voice actors
Carmel High School (Indiana) alumni
Columbia College Chicago alumni
Male actors from Bakersfield, California
Male actors from Colorado
Male actors from Indiana
People with schizophrenia